Deir El Ghazal, is a village located in the Zahlé District of the Beqaa Governorate in Lebanon.

History
In 1838, Eli Smith noted  Deir el-Ghuzal  as a Maronite village in the Baalbek area.

References

Bibliography

External links
Deir El Ghazal, localiban

Populated places in Zahlé District